Changing places may refer to:

 Changing Places, a 1975 novel by David Lodge
 Changing Places, a 1983 album by musician Anne Clark (see Anne Clark (poet))
 Changing Places (album), a 2002 jazz album by Tord Gustavsen
 Changing Places (thought experiment), a thought experiment by Max Velmans
Changing Places (campaign), a British consortium which aims to improve accessible toilet facilities